Intrepid Travel is a small group adventure travel company. The company offers more than 1,100 escorted tours worldwide with an average of 10 travellers per tour. Intrepid is a B Corporation, certified to meet the standards of verified social and environmental performance, public transparency, and legal accountability to balance profit and purpose. Its a non profit organization..Intrepid Foundation has raised more than A$12 million to support communities where it travels.

Tours are led by local tour guides, often use public transport and stay at locally-owned accommodation. The company's headquarters are in Melbourne where it was founded with more than 30 offices worldwide, including Toronto and London. The company is vertically-integrated as it creates and operates its own tours. It also runs tours on behalf of other companies through its destination management company, Intrepid DMC.

Intrepid Travel is majority owned by its co-founders and staff, via a company share scheme.

History
The company was founded in 1989 by two Australian university mates, Darrell Wade and Geoff 'Manch' Manchester, after they quit their jobs and organized a 6-month trip around Africa. The cofounders set out to create a new type of travel that gave back to the people and places that it visits. In its first year, Intrepid carried 46 passengers, with Geoff Manchester as its first tour leader, leading trips in Thailand.

In 2011, TUI Group acquired 60% of the company. However, in 2015, the founders re-acquired those shares after a disagreement in vision with TUI Group.

In February 2021, it launched online virtual experiences under the company's Urban Adventures division.

Corporate responsibility
The company has a focus on responsible travel and is a signatory to the United Nations Global Compact.

In 2010, it became a carbon neutral business  and in 2020 it became the first global tour operator with a verified carbon emissions target from the Science Based Targets initiative. At COP26, the company became a signatory and launch partner to the Glasgow Declaration for Climate Action in Tourism which commits to actions to support the global commitment to halve emissions by 2030 and reach Net Zero as soon as possible before 2050.

In 2014, after funding research by World Animal Protection, it was the first tour operator to ban elephant rides on its tours, which lead to other major tour operators banning elephant rides.

In 2015, it donated the profits from tours in Nepal to rebuild the country after the April 2015 Nepal earthquake.

In 2017, the company set a goal to double its number of female tour leaders. In 2019, it reached its goal, working with 342 female leaders, globally.

In June 2018, it launched vegan tours.

In August 2018, it became a certified B Corporation.

In 2020 and 2021, its not-for-profit supported vulnerable communities impacted by the COVID-19 pandemic, including delivering food packages to families in remote parts of Peru and raising funds for essential medical equipment, including oxygen tanks, in India. 

In 2021, it launched a vaccine equity advocacy and fundraising campaign to raise $150,000 in support of UNICEF Australia to help deliver vaccines to the world’s most vulnerable countries and communities.

See also
Travel plan
TUI Travel

References

External links
 

Adventure travel
Companies based in Melbourne
Transport companies established in 1989
Travel and holiday companies of Australia
1989 establishments in Australia
B Lab-certified corporations in Australia